Vertical Memory is the eighth album by composer Paul Schütze, released in 1995 through Beyond Records. It was released under the pseudonym Seed.

Track listing

Personnel 
Denis Blackham – mastering
Anne-Louise Falsone – design
Andrew Hulme – engineering
Paul Schütze – instruments, production

References 

1995 albums
Paul Schütze albums
Albums produced by Paul Schütze